Perelisky, may refer to the following places in Ukraine:

Perelisky, Lviv Oblast, village in Brody Raion, Lviv Oblast
Perelisky, Poltava Oblast, village in Zinkiv Raion, Poltava Oblast
Perelisky, Sumy Oblast, village in Lebedyn Raion, Sumy Oblast
Perelisky, Vinnytsia Oblast, village in Bar Raion, Vinnytsia Oblast

See also
Pereleski